Joaquín María Bover de Roselló (Seville, 1810 - Palma de Mallorca, 1865) was a Spanish writer and editor who wrote primarily in Spanish but also some poems in Catalan. Bover grew up on Majorca, with occasional stays in Madrid. He was an avid student of the Balearic Islands, writing several books about its geographical and historical aspects, as well as several studies on its writers and literature, such as his dictionary on Balearic writers. He also wrote inspirational poems and poems about local circumstance (at least some of them in Catalan), as well as compiling a Mallorcan Catalan-Spanish dictionary.

Partial list of his works
 1831, Estellencs : descripción histórico-geográfica 1831
 1833, La feliz llegada a Palma del ... Señor Juan Antonio Manet, Capitan General de las islas Baleares
 1833, Oda Sájica a la Real Jura de la Serenísima Señora Princesa de Asturias Doña Isabel Luisa de Borbón
 1834, Oda a la Reina
 1836, Noticias histórico-topográfico de la isla de Mallorca : estadistica general de ella y periodos memorables de su historia
 1836, Oda a la libertad
 1836, Recuerdos de Mahón
 1836, Diccionario manual Mallorquín-Castellano
 1838, Memoria de los pobladores de Mallorca despues de la última conquista por d. Jaime I de Aragon, y noticia de las heredades asignadas á cada uno de ellos en el reparto general de la isla. Sacada de varios códices, historias y documentos inéditos
 1839, Del origen, vicisitudes y estado actual de la literatura en la isla de Mallorca
 1842, Contestación de Joaquin Maria Bover de Rosello ... al artículo del genio de la Libertad del 28 de setiembre último
 1842, Memoria biográfica de los mallorquines que se han distinguido en la antigua y moderna literatura
 1845, Noticia historico-artistica de los museos del Eminentísimo Señor Cardenal Bespuig existentes en Mallorca
 1862, Diccionario bibliográfico de las publicaciones periódicas de las Baleares
 1868, Biblioteca de escritores baleares, a dictionary on the various writers from the Balearic Islands. The first volume can be consulted or downloaded at the American Libraries Internet Archives

References

Further reading
 Bover, Jaume (1981). Bibliografia de Joaquim Maria Bover de Rosselló. Palma de Mallorca: Biblioteca Bartolomé March. (Catalan)
 "Numero extraordinari dedicat a l'erudit Joaquim Maria Bover (1811-1865)". (1981). Bolletí de la Societat Arqueològica Luliana, 2a època, t. 38, no. 834. Palma de Mallorca: Societat Arqueològica Luliana. (Catalan)

External links
 Publications by and about Joquim Maria Bover de Rosselló on WorldCat Identities
 Joaquim Maria Bover de Rosselló in the Enciclopèdia Catalana
 Biblioteca de escritores baleares at American Libraries Internet Archives

1810 births
1865 deaths
People from Seville
People from Palma de Mallorca
Catalan-language writers
Catalan-language poets
19th-century Spanish poets
Poets from Catalonia
Spanish male poets
19th-century male writers